The Sistine Chapel ceiling, painted by Michelangelo between 1508 and 1512, is one of the most renowned artworks of the High Renaissance. Central to the ceiling decoration are nine scenes from the Book of Genesis of which The Creation of Adam is the best known, the hands of God and Adam being reproduced in countless imitations.  The complex design includes several sets of individual figures, both clothed and nude, which allowed Michelangelo to fully demonstrate his skill in creating a huge variety of poses for the human figure, and have provided an enormously influential pattern book of models for other artists ever since.

Gallery

Biblical narratives
Along the centre of the ceiling are nine scenes depicting the Story of Creation, the Downfall of Humanity and the Story of Noah as told in the Book of Genesis.

Prophets and Sibyls
The Prophets of Israel and the Sibyls of the pagan world foretold the coming of the Messiah. Both have been included by Michelangelo as a sign that the Messiah (Jesus Christ) was to come not just for the Jews but also for the Gentiles (non-Jewish people).

Pendentives
The four corner pendentives show violent episodes in which the People of Israel were rescued from enemies, or from their own sinful ways.

Ancestors
The ancestors of Jesus are listed in the Biblical books of Matthew and Luke. This is the first known large painted series, although they were often shown in stained glass. See Tree of Jesse. Although each picture has a title, the characters cannot be positively identified.

Spandrels
Above the windows are a series of families with young children. The children may represent particular children who are mentioned in the Bible, such as Isaac and Samuel. The composition of many of the pictures is similar to that found in depictions of the Holy Family resting on the Flight into Egypt.

Ignudi
The Ignudi that surround the narrative scenes may show the perfection of Humanity, or may represent angels. They were often imitated by other artists.

Shields
The shields represent violent episodes in the history of Israel.

See also
 Index of Vatican City-related articles

References 
 Massimo Giacometti, The Sistine Chapel, a collection of essays on aspects of the chapel, its decoration and the restoration of Michelangelo's frescoes, by Carlo Pietrangeli, André Chastel, John Shearman, John O'Malley S.J., Pierluigi de Vecchi, Michael Hirst, Fabrizio Mancinelli, Gianluigi Colallucci, and Franco Bernabei. 1984, Harmony Books 
 Gabriele Bartz and Eberhard König, Michelangelo, 1998, Könemann,

External links 

 Vatican Museum

Sistine Chapel ceiling